Korbinian Vollmann (born 27 October 1993) is a German professional footballer, who most recently played as an attacking midfielder for FC Hansa Rostock.

Club career
Vollmann is a youth exponent of 1860 Munich. After he played his first four games for 1860 Munich II in the 2011–12 season in the Regionalliga Süd he went on a loan to 3. Liga club Unterhaching for the rest of the season and managed to score once in 13 appearances.

In the upcoming years, Vollmann was a regular player of 1860 Munich II in the Regionalliga Bayern. In the 2014–15 season he replaced injured Michael Kokocinski as captain in several games and scored 14 goals out of 20 appearances.

After this good run of form Vollmann gave his debut for the first team on 22 November 2014 in a 4–1 away win against Union Berlin being substituted for Valdet Rama in 76th minute. In March 2015 he extended his contract until June 2017. Vollmann played his first full match from the beginning on against SV Sandhausen on 8 March 2015. On 13 March 2015, he scored his first goal for the first team of 1860 Munich in a 3–0 away win against Greuther Fürth, when he brought his team to a 2–0 lead in the 65th minute.

On 20 January 2016, he signed for SV Sandhausen.

Club statistics

1.Including Regionalliga playoff and relegation playoff.

References

External links

Living people
1993 births
Footballers from Munich
Association football midfielders
German footballers
TSV 1860 Munich II players
TSV 1860 Munich players
SpVgg Unterhaching players
SV Sandhausen players
FC Hansa Rostock players
2. Bundesliga players
3. Liga players